State Route 19 (SR-19) is a state highway in southeastern Utah, running  in Emery and Grand Counties through Green River.  It carries Business Loop I-70 along Main Street in Green River.

Route description
SR-19 begins at an interchange with I-70 west of Green River and then heads east through the center of town and turns south through the Utah Launch Complex of White Sands Missile Range.  It ends at a frontage road just south of another intersection with I-70.

History

The main road through Green River was added to the state highway system in 1912 and numbered as part of US-50 in the 1920s. The state legislature defined the portion through Green River as State Route 19 in 1969, although the bypass on I-70 had not yet been built. Construction had begun in the mid-1980s, and when finished, the old route, along with a new connection to exit 164, became SR-19.

Major intersections

See also

 List of state highways in Utah

References

External links

019
 019
 019
Streets in Utah
Interstate 70
U.S. Route 6
U.S. Route 50